Sunshine in the Shadows: Their Complete Victor Recordings (1931–1932) is a compilation of recordings made by American country music group the Carter Family, released in 1996. It is the fifth of nine compilations released by Rounder Records of the group's Victor recordings. The original Carter Family group consisting of Alvin Pleasant "A.P." Delaney Carter, his wife Sara Dougherty Carter, and his sister-in-law Maybelle Addington Carter recorded many of what would become their signature songs for Victor Records.

History 
Recorded during the Great Depression, the Carters were paired with country singer Jimmie Rodgers in order to boost record sales. The two duets with Sara and the spoken word sketches featuring Rodgers were recorded in Louisville, Kentucky.

The tracks have all been digitally remastered and include liner notes by country music historian Charles K. Wolfe.

Reception 
In his Allmusic review, music critic Richie Unterberger stated the reissue "...displays the Carters' usual unadorned consistency, moving harmonies, and accomplished picking..." Kels Koch, in his review for No Depression saying the recordings "... served to comfort the shivering and hungry masses.." also concludes that "Six decades later, the stilted dialogue and Rodgers’ tendency to punctuate every sentence with his trademark yodel make for recordings that are at once ridiculous and endearing, not to mention historically invaluable."

Track listing 
All songs are credited to A. P. Carter unless otherwise noted.
 "Sunshine in the Shadows" (A. P. Carter, Traditional) – 2:46  
 "Let the Church Roll On" – 2:41  
 "Lonesome for You" – 2:46  
 "Can't Feel at Home" (Carter, Traditional) – 2:53  
 "Why There's a Tear in My Eye" – 3:08  
 "The Wonderful City" (Jimmie Rodgers, Elsie  McWilliams) – 2:55  
 "Jimmie Rodgers Visits the Carter Family" – 3:16  
 "The Carter Family and Jimmie Rodgers in Texas" (Rodgers) – 3:16  
 "'Mid the Green Fields of Virginia" (Carter, Charles K. Harris) – 2:46  
 "The Happiest Days of All" (Carter, Will L. Thompson) – 3:14  
 "Picture on the Wall" (Bud Landress, Charles E. Moody) – 3:17  
 "Amber Tresses" – 2:46  
 "I Never Loved But One" – 2:53  
 "Tell Me That You Love Me" (Carter, Will S. Hays) – 3:02  
 "Where We'll Never Grow Old" (Carter, James Cleveland) – 3:01
 "We Will March Through the Streets of the City" – 2:48

Personnel 
A. P. Carter – vocals
Maybelle Carter – vocals, guitar, autoharp
Sara Carter – vocals, autoharp
Jimmie Rodgers – vocals
Production notes:
Ralph Peer – producer
David Glasser – mastering
Scott Billington – design
Charles K. Wolfe – liner notes, photography

References

External links 
The Carter Family: A Comprehensive Discography

Carter Family albums
1996 compilation albums
Rounder Records compilation albums